Hong Kong competed at the 2020 Winter Youth Olympics in Lausanne, Switzerland from 9 to 22 January 2020.

Hong Kong made its Winter Youth Olympics debut. The Hong Kong team consisted of four athletes (three men and one woman) competing in two sports: alpine skiing and hockey. Both hockey players would win medals as part of Mixed NOC teams.

Medalists
Medals awarded to participants of mixed-NOC teams are represented in italics. These medals are not counted towards the individual NOC medal tally.

Alpine skiing

Ice hockey

Mixed NOC 3x3 tournament 

Boys - Brown Team
Chuo Xi Elvis Hsu - Bronze Medal

Boys - Green Team
Yau Yam - Gold Medal

See also
Hong Kong at the 2020 Summer Olympics

References

2020 in Hong Kong sport
Nations at the 2020 Winter Youth Olympics
Hong Kong at the Youth Olympics